People known by the initials C. P. include:

C. P. Chitrarasu (1908–1978), Indian politician and writer
C. P. Connolly (1863–1935), American investigative journalist
C. P. Couch (1890–1955), president of Kansas City Southern Railway
C. P. Gurnani (born 1958), CEO of Tech Mahindra
C. P. Johnstone (1895–1974), English born cricketer who played mainly in India
C. P. Joshi (born 1950), Indian politician
C. P. Lounsbury (1872–1955), American-born South African entomologist
C. P. Lyons (1915–1998), Canadian outdoorsman and natural historian
C. P. Mohammed (born 1952), Indian politician
C. P. Newton (1879–1958), American politician
C. P. Radhakrishnan (born 1957), Indian politician
C. P. Rajendran (born 1955), Indian geologist
C. P. Ramachandran (1923–1997), Indian journalist and political activist
C. P. Rele (1920s–2010), Hindustani classical musician
C. P. Sadashivaiah (1931–2007), Indian freedom fighter, industrialist, philanthropist and inventor
C. P. Sinha, Indian politician
C. P. Snow (1905–1980), English physical chemist and novelist
C. P. Spencer (1938–2004), American musician, singer, songwriter and record producer
C. P. Thakur (born 1931), Indian politician
C. P. Trussell (1892–1968), American journalist
C P Udayabhanu (born 1959), Indian public prosecutor
C. P. Wang (born 1947), Taiwanese architect
C. P. Yogeshwar (born 1962), Indian politician